Daniela De Angelis is an Italian biostatistician in the area of infectious disease modelling. Her current roles are Professor of Statistical Science for Health at the University of Cambridge in the Department of Primary Care and Public Health and Deputy Director and Programme Leader at the  Medical Research Council Biostatistics Unit. She has published research on the development and application of statistical methods to monitor infectious diseases such as SARS COVID-19, influenza, HIV and hepatitis C. Daniela is member of scientific advisory groups such as NICE, WHO, and UNAIDS. She is a member of SPI-M (Scientific Pandemic Influenza Advisory Committee, subgroup on Modelling) and the Royal Statistical Society Task Force for COVID-19

Career history 

In 2017, the  Infected Blood Inquiry was launched. Daniela De Angelis is a member of the Statistics Expert Group as part of this inquiry.

In 2019, De Angelis was appointed Professor of Statistical Science for Health at the University of Cambridge.

Research

HIV 
In HIV modelling, Daniela De Angelis was the senior author of a study that found that England is set to have diagnosed 95% of people living with HIV by 2025. This is one of three aspects of UNAIDS' 90-90-90 goal: to have 90% of people with HIV diagnosed, 90% of people diagnosed with HIV receiving antiretroviral therapy and 90% of people receiving this therapy having viral suppresion.

SARS COVID-19 
Daniela De Angelis was the senior statistician for the MRC Biostatistics Unit's ″nowcasting″ and forecasting of COVID-19 data: using statistical modelling to estimate current (and predict future) numbers of infections, Rt, numbers of hospital admissions and more, by age and region in England. This information was fed directly to the SAGE sub-group, SPI-M and to regional teams at UK Health Security Agency (UK HSA).

Recognition 

In 2018, Prof. De Angelis received the Suffrage Science Award in Maths & Computing.

In 2021 she was given the University of Cambridge Vice-Chancellor's Established Academic Award for her work on real-time monitoring of the SARS-COV2 pandemic

In 2022, Prof. De Angelis was awarded an honorary MBE for services to medical research and public health. In this year she was also awarded the Weldon Memorial Prize as a member of the Scientific Pandemic Influenza Group on Modelling, Operational sub-group (SPI-M-O)

See also
Medical Research Council

References

Further reading
Modeling infectious disease dynamics in the complex landscape of global health

External links
Medical Research Council Biostatistics Unit

Year of birth missing (living people)
Living people